The 1989 NCAA Division III men's basketball tournament was the 15th annual single-elimination tournament to determine the national champions of National Collegiate Athletic Association (NCAA) men's Division III collegiate basketball in the United States.

Held during March 1989, the field included forty teams, an increase of eight from 1988. For the first time, the championship rounds were contested in Springfield, Ohio.

Wisconsin–Whitewater defeated Trenton State (now TCNJ), 94–86, to clinch their second NCAA Division III national title. The Warhawks' previous title came in 1984.

Championship Rounds
Site: Springfield, Ohio

See also
1989 NCAA Division I men's basketball tournament
1989 NCAA Division II men's basketball tournament
1989 NCAA Division III women's basketball tournament
1989 NAIA Division I men's basketball tournament

References

NCAA Division III men's basketball tournament
NCAA Men's Division III Basketball
Ncaa Tournament
NCAA Division III basketball tournament